Croquet ( or) is a sport that involves hitting wooden or plastic balls with a mallet through hoops (often called "wickets" in the United States) embedded in a grass playing court.

Its international governing body is the World Croquet Federation.

Variations
There are several variations of croquet currently played, differing in the scoring systems, order of shots, and layout (particularly in social games where play must be adapted to smaller-than-standard playing courts). Two forms of the game, association croquet (AC) and golf croquet (GC), have rules that are agreed upon internationally and are played in many countries around the world. The United States has its own set of rules for domestic games. Gateball, a sport that originated in Japan under the influence of croquet, is played mainly in East and Southeast Asia and the Americas, and can also be regarded as a croquet variant.

As well as club-level games, there are regular world championships and international matches between croquet-playing countries. The sport has particularly strong followings in the UK, US, New Zealand, Australia and Egypt; many other countries also play. Every four years, the top countries play in the World Team Championships in AC (the MacRobertson Shield) and GC (the Openshaw Shield). The current world rankings show England in top place for AC, followed by Australia in second place, New Zealand in third place, with the United States in fourth position; the same four countries appear in the top six of the GC country rankings, below Egypt in top position, and with Spain at number six.

Croquet is popularly believed to be viciously competitive. This may derive from the fact that (unlike in golf) players will often attempt to move their opponents' balls to unfavourable positions. However, purely negative play is rarely a winning strategy; successful players (in all versions other than golf croquet) will use all four balls to set up a break for themselves, rather than simply making the game as difficult as possible for their opponents. At championship-standard association croquet, players can often make all 26 points (13 for each ball) in two turns.

Croquet was an event at the 1900 Summer Olympics. Roque, an American variation on croquet, was an event at the 1904 Summer Olympics.

Beginning in 1894 Spalding Athletic Library issued official rules (with illustrations) as adopted by the National American Croquet Association.

Association

Association croquet is the name of an advanced game of croquet, played at all levels up to international level. It involves four balls teamed in pairs, with both balls going through every hoop for one pair to win. The game's distinguishing feature is the "croquet" shot: when certain balls hit other balls, extra shots are allowed. The six hoops are arranged three at each end of the court, with a centre peg.

One side takes the blue and black balls, the other takes red and yellow. At each turn, players can choose to play with either of their balls for that turn. At the start of a turn, the player plays a stroke. If the player either hits the ball through the correct hoop ("runs" the hoop), or hits another ball (a "roquet"), the turn continues.

Following a roquet, the player picks up his or her own ball and puts it down next to the ball that it hit. The next shot is played with the two balls touching: this is the "croquet stroke" from which the game takes its name. By varying the speed and angle at which the mallet hits the striker's ball, a good player can control the final position of both balls: the horizontal angle determines how far the balls diverge in direction, while the vertical angle and the amount of follow-through determine the relative distance that the two balls travel.

After the croquet stroke, the player plays a "continuation" stroke, during which the player may again attempt to make a roquet or run a hoop. Each of the other three balls may be roqueted once in a turn before a hoop is run, after which they become available to be roqueted again.

The winner of the game is the team who completes the set circuit of six hoops (and then back again the other way), with both balls, and then strikes the centre peg (making a total of 13 points per ball = 26).

Good players may make "s" or "s" of several hoops in a single turn. The best players may take a ball round a full circuit in one turn. "Advanced play" (a variant of association play for expert players) gives penalties to a player who runs certain hoops in a turn, to allow the opponent a chance of getting back into the game; feats of skill such as triple peels or better, in which the partner ball (or occasionally an opponent ball) is caused to run a number of hoops in a turn by the striker's ball, help avoid these penalties.

A handicap system ("bisques") provides less experienced players a chance of winning against more formidable opponents. Players of all ages and both sexes compete on level terms.

The World Championships are organised by the World Croquet Federation (WCF) and usually take place every two or three years. The 2020 championships took place in Melbourne, Australia; the winner was Reg Bamford. The current Women's Association Croquet World Champion (2015) is Miranda Chapman of England.

The Australian team won the last MacRobertson International Croquet Shield tournament, which is the major international test tour trophy in association croquet. It is contested every three to four years between Australia, England, the United States and New Zealand. Historically the British have been the dominant force, winning 14 out of the 22 times that the event has been held. In individual competition, the UK is often divided by subnational country (England, Scotland and Wales), while Northern Ireland joins with the Republic in an All Ireland association (as it does in several other sports).

The world's top 10 association croquet players as of December 2020 were Robert Fletcher (Australia), Reg Bamford (South Africa), Robert Fulford (England),  Paddy Chapman (New Zealand), Matthew Essick (USA), Jonathan Kirby (Scotland), Simon Hockey (Australia), Malcolm Fletcher (Australia), Edward Wilson (Australia), Stephen Mulliner (England).

Unlike most sports, men and women compete and are ranked together. Three women have won the British Open Championship: Lily Gower in 1905, Dorothy Steel in 1925, 1933, 1935 and 1936, and Hope Rotherham in 1960. While male players are in the majority at club level in the UK, the opposite is the case in Australia and New Zealand.

The governing body in England is The Croquet Association, which has been the driving force of the development of the game. The laws and rules are now maintained by the World Croquet Federation.

Golf
In golf croquet, a hoop is won by the first ball to go through each hoop. Unlike association croquet, there are no additional turns for hitting other balls.

Each player takes a stroke in turn, each trying to hit a ball through the same hoop. The sequence of play is blue, red, black, yellow. Blue and black balls play against red and yellow. When a hoop is won, the sequence of play continues as before. The winner of the game is the player/team who wins the most hoops.

Golf croquet is the fastest-growing version of the game, owing largely to its simplicity and competitiveness. There is an especially large interest in competitive success by players in Egypt. Golf croquet is easier to learn and play, but requires strategic skills and accurate play. In comparison with association croquet, play is faster and balls are more likely to be lifted off the ground.

In April 2013, Reg Bamford of South Africa beat Ahmed Nasr of Egypt in the final of the Golf Croquet World Championship in Cairo, becoming the first person to simultaneously hold the title in both association croquet and golf croquet. As of 2020, the Golf Croquet World Champion was Ben Rothman (USA) and the Women's Golf Croquet World Champion was Soha Mostafa (Egypt).

In 2018, two international championships open to both sexes were won by women: in May, Rachel Gee of England beat Pierre Beaudry of Belgium to win the European Golf Croquet championship, and in October, Hanan Rashad of Egypt beat Yasser Fathy (also from Egypt) to win the World over-50s Golf Croquet championship.

American six-wicket
The American-rules version of croquet, another six-hoop game, is the dominant version of the game in the United States and is also widely played in Canada. It is governed by the United States Croquet Association. Its genesis is mostly in association croquet, but it differs in a number of important ways that reflect the home-grown traditions of American "backyard" croquet.

Two of the most notable differences are that the balls are always played in the same sequence (blue, red, black, yellow) throughout the game, and that a ball's "deadness" on other balls is carried over from turn to turn until the ball has been "cleared" by scoring its next hoop. A Deadness Board is used to keep track of deadness on all four balls. Tactics are simplified on the one hand by the strict sequence of play, and complicated on the other hand by the continuation of deadness.

A further difference is the more restrictive boundary-line rules of American croquet. "Attacking" balls on the boundary line to bring them into play is thus far more challenging.

Nine-wicket
Nine-wicket croquet, sometimes called "backyard croquet", is played mainly in Canada and the United States, and is the game most recreational players in those countries call simply "croquet". In this version of croquet, there are nine wickets, two stakes, and up to six balls. The course is arranged in a double-diamond pattern, with one stake at each end of the course. Players start at one stake, navigate one side of the double diamond, hit the turning stake, then navigate the opposite side of the double diamond and hit the starting stake to end. If playing individually (Cutthroat), the first player to stake out is the winner. In partnership play, all members of a team must stake out, and a player might choose to avoid staking out (becoming a Rover) in order to help a lagging teammate.

Each time a ball is roqueted, the striker gets two bonus shots.
For the first bonus shot, the player has four options:
 From a mallet-head distance or less away from the ball that was hit ("taking a mallet-head")
 From a position in contact with the ball that was hit, with the striker ball held steady by the striker's foot or hand (a "foot shot" or "hand shot")
 From a position in contact with the ball that was hit, with the striker ball not held by foot or hand (a "croquet shot")
 From where the striker ball stopped after the roquet.
The second bonus shot ("continuation shot") is an ordinary shot played from where the striker ball came to rest.

An alternate endgame is "poison": in this variant, a player who has scored the last wicket but not hit the starting stake becomes a "poison ball", which may eliminate other balls from the game by roqueting them. A non-poison ball that roquets a poison ball has the normal options. A poison ball that hits a stake or passes through any wicket (possibly by the action of a non-poison player) is eliminated. The last person remaining is the winner.

History

The oldest document to bear the word croquet with a description of the modern game is the set of rules registered by Isaac Spratt in November 1856 with the Stationers' Company of London. This record is now in the Public Record Office. In 1868, the first croquet all-comers meet was held at Moreton-in-Marsh, Gloucestershire and in the same year the All England Croquet Club was formed at Wimbledon, London.

Regardless when and by what route it reached the British Isles and the British colonies in its recognizable form, croquet is, like pall-mall and trucco,  among the later forms of ground billiards, which as a class have been popular in Western Europe back to at least the Late Middle Ages, with roots in classical antiquity, including sometimes the use of arches and pegs along with balls and mallets or other striking sticks (some more akin to modern field hockey sticks).

In the book Queen of Games: The History of Croquet, Nicky Smith presents two theories of the origin of the modern game of croquet, which took England by storm in the 1860s and then spread overseas.

First origin theory
This was the explanation given in the ninth edition of Encyclopædia Britannica, dated 1877.

In his 1801 book The Sports and Pastimes of the People of England, Joseph Strutt described the way pall-mall was played in England at the time:"Pale-maille is a game wherein a round box[wood] ball is struck with a mallet through a high arch of iron, which he that can do at the fewest blows, or at the number agreed upon, wins. It is to be observed, that there are two of these arches, that is one at either end of the alley. The game of mall was a fashionable amusement in the reign of Charles the Second, and the walk in Saint James's Park, now called the Mall, received its name from having been appropriated to the purpose of playing at mall, where Charles himself and his courtiers frequently exercised themselves in the practice of this pastime."

While the name pall-mall and various games bearing this name also appeared elsewhere (France and Italy), the description above suggests that the croquet-like games in particular were popular in England by the early 17th century. The image's caption describes the game as "a curious ancient pastime", confirming that croquet games were not new in early-19th-century England.

In Samuel Johnson's 1755 dictionary, his definition of "pall-mall" clearly describes a game with similarities to modern croquet: "A play in which the ball is struck with a mallet through an iron ring". However, there is no evidence that pall-mall involved the croquet stroke which is the distinguishing characteristic of the modern game.

Second origin theory
The second theory is that the rules of the modern game of croquet arrived from Ireland during the 1850s, perhaps after being brought there from Brittany, where a similar game was played on the beaches. Regular contact between Ireland and France had continued since the Norman invasion of Ireland in 1169. By no later than the early 15th century, the game  (itself ancestral to pall-mall and perhaps to indoor billiards) was popular in France, including in the courts of Henry II in the 16th century and Louis XIV of the 17th.

At least one version of it,  ('wheel') was a multi-ball lawn game.  Records show a game called "crookey", similar to croquet, being played at Castlebellingham in County Louth, Ireland, in 1834, which was introduced to Galway in 1835 and played on the bishop's palace garden, and in the same year to the genteel Dublin suburb of Kingstown (today Dún Laoghaire) where it was first spelt as "croquet". There is, however, no pre-1858 Irish document that describes the way game was played, in particular, there is no reference to the distinctive croquet stroke, which is described above under "Variations: Association". The noted croquet historian Dr Prior, in his book of 1872, makes the categoric statement "One thing only is certain: it is from Ireland that croquet came to England and it was on the lawn of the late Lord Lonsdale that it was first played in this country." This was about 1851.

John Jaques apparently claimed in a letter to Arthur Lillie in 1873 that he had himself seen the game played in Ireland, writing "I made the implements and published directions (such as they were) before Mr. Spratt [mentioned above] introduced the subject to me." Whatever the truth of the matter, Jaques certainly played an important role in popularising the game, producing editions of the rules in 1857, 1860, and 1864.

Heyday and decline
Croquet became highly popular as a social pastime in England during the 1860s. It was enthusiastically adopted and promoted by the Earl of Essex who held lavish croquet parties at Cassiobury House, his stately home in Watford, Hertfordshire, and the Earl even launched his own Cassiobury brand croquet set. By 1867, Jaques had printed 65,000 copies of his Laws and Regulations of the game. It quickly spread to other Anglophone countries, including Australia, Canada, New Zealand, South Africa, and the United States. No doubt one of the attractions was that the game could be played by both sexes; this also ensured a certain amount of adverse comment.

It is no coincidence that the game became popular at the same time as the cylinder lawn mower, since croquet can only be played well on a lawn that is flat and finely-cut.

By the late 1870s, however, croquet had been eclipsed by another fashionable game, lawn tennis, and many of the newly created croquet clubs, including the All England Club at Wimbledon, converted some or all of their lawns into tennis courts.

There was a revival in the 1890s, but from then onwards, croquet was always a minority sport, with national individual participation amounting to a few thousand players. The All England Lawn Tennis and Croquet Club still has a croquet lawn, but has not hosted any significant tournaments. The English headquarters for the game is now in Cheltenham.

The earliest known reference to croquet in Scotland is the booklet The Game of Croquet, its Laws and Regulations which was published in the mid-1860s for the proprietor of Eglinton Castle, the Earl of Eglinton. On the page facing the title page is a picture of Eglinton Castle with a game of "croquet" in full swing.

The croquet lawn existed on the northern terrace, between Eglinton Castle and the Lugton Water. The 13th Earl developed a variation on croquet named Captain Moreton's Eglinton Castle croquet, which had small bells on the eight hoops "to ring the changes", two pegs, a double hoop with a bell and two tunnels for the ball to pass through. In 1865 the 'Rules of the Eglinton Castle and Cassiobury Croquet' was published by Edmund Routledge. Several incomplete sets of this form of croquet are known to exist, and one complete set is still used for demonstration games in the West of Scotland.

Glossary of terms

Backward ball The ball of a side that has scored fewer hoops (compare with 'forward ball').
Ball-in-hand A ball that the striker can pick up to change its position, for example:
 any ball when it leaves the court has to be replaced on the yard-line
 the striker's ball after making a roquet must be placed in contact with the roqueted ball
 the striker's ball when the striker is entitled to a lift.
Ball in play A ball after it has been played into the game, which is not a ball in hand or pegged out.
Baulk An imaginary line on which a ball is placed for its first shot in the game, or when taking a lift. The A-baulk coincides with the western half of the yard line along the south boundary; the B-baulk occupies the eastern half of the north boundary yard line.
Bisque, half-bisque A bisque is a free turn in a handicap match. A half-bisque is a restricted handicap turn in which no point may be scored.
Break down To end a turn by making a mistake.
Continuation stroke Either the bonus stroke played after running a hoop in order or the second bonus stroke played after making a roquet.
Croquet stroke A stroke taken after making a roquet, in which the striker's ball and the roqueted ball are placed together in contact.
Double tap A fault in which the mallet makes more than one audible sound when it strikes the ball.
Forward ball The ball of a side that has scored more hoops (compare with 'backward ball').
Hit In To make a roquet, usually at distance, which starts a break.
Hoop Metal U-shaped gate pushed into ground. (Also called a wicket in the US, which is of the same etymology as wicket gate).
Leave The position of the balls after a successful break, in which the striker is able to leave the balls placed so as to make life as difficult as possible for the opponent.
Lift A turn in which the player is entitled to remove the ball from its current position and play instead from either baulk line. A lift is permitted when a ball has been placed by the opponent in a position where it is wired from all other balls, and also in advanced play when the opponent has completed a break that includes hoops 1-back or 4-back.
Object ball A ball which is going to be rushed.
Peg out To cause a rover ball to strike the peg and conclude its active involvement in the game.
Peel To send a ball other than the striker's ball through its target hoop.
Pioneer A ball placed in a strategic position near the striker's next-but-one or next-but-two hoop, to assist in running that hoop later in the break.
Primary colours or first colours The main croquet ball colours used which are blue, red, black and yellow (in order of play). One player or team plays blue and black, the other red and yellow.
Push A fault when the mallet pushes the striker's ball, rather than making a clean strike.
Roquet (Second syllable rhymes with "play".) When the striker's ball hits a ball that he is entitled to then take a croquet shot with. At the start of a turn, the striker is entitled to roquet all the other three balls once. Once the striker's ball goes through its target hoop, it is again entitled to roquet the other balls once.
Rover ball A ball that has run all 12 hoops and can be pegged out.
Rover hoop The last hoop, indicated by a red top bar. The first hoop has a blue top.
Run a hoop To send the striker's ball through a hoop. If the hoop is the hoop in order for the striker's ball, the striker earns a bonus stroke.
Rush A roquet when the roqueted ball is sent to a specific position on the court, such as the next hoop for the striker's ball or close to a ball that the striker wishes to roquet next.
Scatter shot A continuation stroke used to hit a ball which may not be roqueted in order to send it to a less dangerous position.
Secondary colours (also known as second colours or alternate colours) The colours of the balls used in the second game played on the same court in double-banking: green, pink, brown and white (in order of play). Green and brown versus pink and white, are played by the same player or pair.
Sextuple peel (SXP) To peel the partner ball through its last six hoops in the course of a single turn. Very few players have achieved this feat, but it is being seen increasingly at championship level.
Tice A ball sent to a location that will entice an opponent to shoot at it but miss.
Triple peel (TP) To send a ball other than the striker's ball through its last three hoops, and then peg it out. See also Triple Peel, A variant is the Triple Peel on Opponent (TPO), where the peelee is the opponent's ball rather than the partner ball. The significance of this manoeuvre is that in advanced play, making a break that includes the tenth hoop (called 4-back) is penalized by granting the opponent a lift (entitling him to take the next shot from either baulk line). Therefore, many breaks stop voluntarily with three hoops and the peg still to run.
Wired When a hoop or the peg impedes the path of a striker's ball, or the swing of the mallet. A player will often endeavour to finish a turn with the opponent's balls wired from each other.
Yard line An imaginary line  from the boundary. Balls that go off the boundary are generally replaced on the yard line (but if this happens on a croquet stroke, the turn ends).

In art and literature

The way croquet is depicted in paintings and books says much about popular perceptions of the game, though little about the reality of modern play.
 In 1868 a song titled Croquet (essentially anonymous: by M.B.C.S and W.O.F.) was included in a popular song book by W. O. Perkins, The Golden Robin (Pub. Oliver Ditson & Company, New York). ("Upon the smoothly shaven lawn, Beneath the skies of May, Oh, boys and girls, this merry morn, Come out and play Croquet ..."); there are four full verses.
 Winslow Homer, Édouard Manet, and Pierre Bonnard all have paintings titled The Croquet Game.
 Norman Rockwell often depicted the game, including in his painting Croquet.
 Edward Gorey's The Epiplectic Bicycle features illustrations of the main characters playing with croquet mallets.
 Croquet is popular pastime of Leo Tolstoy's Anna Karenina characters.
 H. G. Wells wrote The Croquet Player which uses croquet as a metaphor for the way in which people confront the very problem of their own existence.
 Lewis Carroll featured a nonsense version of the game in the popular children's novel Alice's Adventures in Wonderland: a hedgehog was used as the ball, a flamingo as the mallet, and playing cards as the hoops.
 In the Thursday Next series of novels, notably Something Rotten, Jasper Fforde depicts an alternative world in which croquet is a brutal mass spectator sport.
 The cover of the 1971 Genesis album Nursery Cryme shows Cynthia, a character in the song "Musical Box" holding a croquet mallet with a few heads on the playing field including another character of the song Henry's head that she removed with said mallet.
 In Stephen King's 1977 novel The Shining, the main character, Jack Torrance, uses a croquet mallet to chase and attack the other characters. The 1997 miniseries features the use of croquet however, Stanley Kubrick's 1980 film adaptation uses a fire axe instead.
 In the 1980s geography game Where in the World Is Carmen Sandiego?, one of the characters, Fast Eddie B, is described as a "world class croquet player", and two other gang members, Ihor Ihorovich and Scar Graynolt, also play the sport.
 In the 1988 film Heathers, Veronica (Winona Ryder) and her friends, the Heathers, are depicted as playing croquet, though at the beginning, the Heathers are playing croquet to hit Veronica on the head. Croquet mallets also feature in the publicity posters for Heathers: The Musical.
 Croquet is featured prominently in the music video for "I'm Not Okay (I Promise)" by My Chemical Romance.
 Croquet is featured in the novel Grapes of Wrath by John Steinbeck wherein the Joads stay at the government camp in Weedpatch, Ca.

Clubs
About 200 croquet clubs across the United States are members of the United States Croquet Association.

Many colleges have croquet clubs as well, such as The University of Virginia, The University of Chicago, Pennsylvania State University, Bates College, SUNY New Paltz, Harvard University, and Dartmouth College. Notably, St. John's College and the US Naval Academy engage in a yearly match in Annapolis, Maryland. Both schools also compete at the collegiate level and the rivalry continues to be an Annapolis tradition, attracting thousands of spectators each April.

In England and Wales, there are around 170 clubs affiliated with the Croquet Association. The All England Lawn Tennis and Croquet Club at Wimbledon is famous for its lawn tennis tournament, but retains an active croquet section. There are also clubs in many universities and colleges, with an annual Varsity match being played between Oxford and Cambridge. With over 1800 participants, the 2011 Oxford University "Cuppers" (inter-college) tournament claimed to be not only the largest croquet tournament ever, but the largest sporting event in the university's history.

There are 112 clubs in New Zealand, affiliated with 19 associations. These are governed by Croquet New Zealand.

See also

 Croquet Hall of Fame
 Extreme croquet
 Jaques of London
 US intercollegiate croquet champions
 Roque
 Woodball

References

External links

 A Synopsis of the Laws of Association Croquet, from Oxford Croquet
 Synopsis of American Croquet, from the United States Croquet Association
 The official rules of Backyard Croquet (nine-wicket layout), from the United States Croquet Association
 Official Rules of Garden Croquet (British six-hoop garden croquet)
 Croquet Rules and Regulations, from Croquet.com
 The Croquet Association Jargon List
 Arkley Croquet Collection – An exceptional selection of paintings, cartoons and photographs depicting the game of croquet, from UBC Library Digital Collections
  Checklist of Croquet Books and Pamphlets, 1853 to 2002

 
Former Summer Olympic sports
Lawn games
Stick sports
Sports originating in England
Sports originating in the United Kingdom